Ninaika Therintha Manamae is a 2017-2018 Indian Tamil-language drama television series starring Ashwin Kumar Lakshmikanthan, Aishwarya Pisse and Uma Riyaz Khan. It premiered on 25 December 2017 on Vijay TV, and ended after 90 episodes on 27 April 2018.

Synopsis
The story follows Deepa, a woman who loses her memory in an accident. Deepa also loses her unborn child in the accident but does not realize it. She wakes up alongside Aravind, who lives in the same building as she.

After the accident, Aravind is reunited with his family, who assume that Deepa is his significant other. Aravind does not correct his family and they accept Deepa and bring her into their family. Aravind's family treats her well and they soon arrange a wedding for Deepa and Aravind.

After the wedding, Deepa's past is revealed to the rest of the family. They find out that Deepa's real name is Karthika, and that she had a husband named Gautham. Gautham's family finds Karthika (now Deepa) and they decide to bring her back. After learning of this, a shocked Karthika decides to leave Aravind's house.

However, Karthika forgets that Gautham treated her poorly, which was what prompted her to leave. Gautham wants her property, which he will get once her grandfather passes away.

Gautham is a drunk who used to quarrel frequently with Karthika. During one of Gautham's drunken binges, she convinced him to sign divorce papers. After the divorce, Karthika started a new life in which she met Aravind.

In the climax of the show, it is found that Karthika is pregnant with Aravind's baby and the show ends with Karthika and Aravind being happy.

Cast

Main
 Ashwin Kumar Lakshmikanthan as Aravind
 Aishwarya Pisse as Deepa / Karthika, Aravind's wife  and Gautham's ex-wife
 Uma Riyaz Khan as Mallika

Supporting
 Sudha (சுதா) as Lalitha (Aravind's Mother)
 Kala Kalyani (காலா கல்யாணி) as Pallavi (Mallika's Daughter)
 Meenakshi (மீனாட்சி) as Madhavi (Aravind's elder Sister)
 Raghavi (ராகவி) as Meenu (Aravind's Younger Sister)
 P. R. Varalaxmi (வரலக்ஷ்மி) as Kamakshi
 Sangeetha Balan (சங்கீதா பாலன்) as Kannamma
 Bala Hasan. R as Gautham
 Anita Nair (அனிதாநாயர்) as Revathy (Gautham's Mother)
Aishwarya Ramsai as Meenu (Aravind's sister)

Casting
This was the first time Ashwin Kumar Lakshmikanthan and Aishwarya were paired. Ashwin Kumar Lakshmikanthan, formerly of the series Rettai Vaal Kuruvi, plays the lead male role. Ashwin Kumar Lakshmikanthan and Aishwarya both made their Tamil-language debuts with this series.

Airing history 
The show started airing on Vijay TV on 25 December 2017 and it aired from Monday through Friday at 21:30 (IST). Beginning on Monday, 5 February 2018, the show was shifted to Monday through Friday at 22:00 (IST). A show named Chinna Thambi replaced this show at 21:30 (IST).

Awards and nominations

International broadcast
The series was released on 25 December 2017 on Vijay TV and Vijay TV HD. The show was broadcast internationally on the channel's international channel. 
 It was aired in Sri Lanka, Singapore, Vietnam, Japan, Hong Kong, United States, Europe, Malaysia, Mauritius and South Africa on Vijay TV and Vijay TV HD with English subtitles.
 The drama is available in the streaming app Hotstar, with some episodes provided with English subtitles for wider viewership.
 It is also available via the internet protocol television service, Lebara Play with English subtitles.

References

External links
Aishwarya Pisse
official website at Hotstar

Star Vijay original programming
Tamil-language romance television series
Tamil-language thriller television series
2010s Tamil-language television series
2017 Tamil-language television series debuts
Tamil-language television shows
2018 Tamil-language television series endings